Sisters (released as Blood Sisters in the United Kingdom) is a 1972 American psychological horror film directed by Brian De Palma and starring Margot Kidder, Jennifer Salt, and Charles Durning. A French Canadian model's separated conjoined twin is suspected of having committed a brutal murder witnessed by a newspaper reporter in Staten Island, New York City.

Co-written by De Palma and Louisa Rose, the screenplay for the film was inspired by the Soviet conjoined twins Masha and Dasha Krivoshlyapova and features narrative and visual references to several films by Alfred Hitchcock. Filmed on location in Staten Island, the film prominently features split-screen compositions (also present in subsequent De Palma films such as Carrie), and was scored by frequent Hitchcock collaborator Bernard Herrmann.

Released in the spring of 1973, Sisters received praise from critics who noted its adept performances and use of homage. It marked the first thriller for De Palma, who followed it with other shocking, graphic thrillers, and went on to become a cult film in the years after its release.

Plot 
Advertising salesman Philip Woode wins dinner for two at a Manhattan restaurant on a Candid Camera-style television show. Danielle Breton, a young French Canadian model and aspiring actress who was part of the prank, flirts with him and he agrees to take her as his date. After dinner, they retire to her apartment to have sex. The next morning, Danielle tells Philip that Dominique, her twin sister, has come to celebrate their birthday. At her request, he goes to the drug store to refill a prescription and picks up a birthday cake at a bakery on his way back. When he returns, he is stabbed to death by the crazed Dominique. Before he dies, he tries to alert a neighbor by writing "help" in his own blood on a window.

The neighbor, a reporter named Grace Collier, calls the police. Danielle's ex-husband Emil helps her clean up and hide Philip's body by folding it inside the sofabed. Grace accompanies the skeptical Detective Kelly and his partner on a search of Danielle's apartment, but Danielle insists that she has been alone since last night.

Certain that Danielle is hiding the murderer, Grace persuades her editor to let her investigate the story on the basis that the police are ignoring her because Philip was black. She hires Larch, a private investigator, to gain access to the apartment. He determines that the couch contains the body. He also finds a thick file from the Loisel Institute on the Blanchion Twins, Canada's first conjoined twins. Grace's further investigations uncover that the twins were separated only recently, and that Dominique apparently died during the operation.

As Larch pursues the truck that Emil called to haul the couch away, Grace tails Emil and Danielle to a mental hospital. When she is caught, Emil convinces the staff that she is a new patient. He sedates her and promises to reveal everything, placing Danielle on the bed beside her. Grace has a bizarre dream about the twins' past and their separation, in which she herself is Dominique. Emil tells Danielle that the separation was necessary to save Danielle from the violent Dominique, who died during the surgery. Whenever she has a sexual experience, Danielle now dissociates to a violent "Dominique" personality. Emil kisses Danielle passionately to bring forth "Dominique," but she slashes him in the groin with a scalpel, and he bleeds to death. Grace awakens to find the sorrowful Danielle tenderly embracing Emil's bloody body and screams in horror. Detective Kelly arrests Danielle, who denies knowledge of the murders and says that her sister is dead.

Kelly interviews Grace, who is still under Emil's hypnotic spell, repeating lines that he fed her to deny there was a murder. Larch tracks the sofa to a remote train station in Canada.

Cast 
 Margot Kidder as Danielle Breton / Dominique Blanchion
 Jennifer Salt as Grace Collier
 William Finley as Emil Breton
 Charles Durning as Joseph Larch
 Lisle Wilson as Phillip Woode
 Barnard Hughes as Arthur McLennen
 Mary Davenport as Mrs. Peyson Collier
 Dolph Sweet as Detective Kelly
 Olympia Dukakis as Louise Wilanski (uncredited)
 Catherine Gaffigan as Arlene 
 Justine Johnston as Elaine D'Anna 
 James Mapes as Guard 
 Burt Richards as Hospital Attendant 
 Bill Durks as a Sanitorium resident

Analysis 
Scholarly discussion of Sisters has centered largely on its prevalent theme of voyeurism as well as a perceived commentary on the women's liberation movement. Film critic and scholar Robin Wood wrote that the film "analyzes the ways in which women are oppressed within patriarchy society on two levels, the professional (Grace) and the psychosexual (Danielle/Dominique)." He adds: "If the monster is defined as that which threatens normality, it follows that the monster of Sisters is Grace as well as Danielle/Dominiquea point the film acknowledges in a cinematic hallucination/flashback sequence wherein Grace becomes Dominique...  Simply, one can define the monster of Sisters as women's liberation."

The prominent allusions to works by Alfred Hitchcock have also been noted by critics such as Bruce Kawin, who wrote in 2000:

Production

Development 
De Palma was inspired to write the screenplay for Sisters after reading an article in Life magazine in 1966 about the lives of the Soviet conjoined twins Masha and Dasha Krivoshlyapova: 

The script, which De Palma co-wrote with Louisa Rose, features structural elements inspired by Hitchcock, such as killing off a prominent character early into the film, alternating points of view, and the involvement of a third party observer in solving a crime. In writing the exposition of the film which details the twins' history and institutionalization, De Palma was influenced by Roman Polanski's Rosemary's Baby (1968), specifically the scene in which Rosemary is raped and conceives her child.

Filming 
Sisters was shot over a period of eight weeks in New York City in spring 1972, primarily in the borough of Staten Island. The apartment interiors were filmed on a set, with additional exterior photography of the Time-Life Building in Manhattan. The film was shot using Mitchell BNC cameras with Panavision lenses. According to De Palma, the film was lit with a "truly classical style", with scenes sometimes taking 45 minutes to set up. Some sequences were shot on 16 mm film by De Palma himself, such as the scene in which Emil speaks directly to the camera during the finale's hallucination sequence.

Visual style 
The film uses unusual point of view shots and split screen effects to show two events happening simultaneously, as well as long tracking shots, some in excess of six minutes in length. The extended tracking shot in Danielle's apartment following the murder of Phillip was influenced by Max Ophüls and directly references Hitchcock's Rope. The theme of voyeurism is represented in the alternating points-of-view and distortions of perspective within the narrative diegesis; De Palma commented: "I really got the idea from watching the Vietnam war on television  watching a war that nobody really knew about except that we watched it every night on the 7 o'clock news. It was really a very voyeuristic war, and I think it says a lot about the way we perceive things. We are very much controlled by the media which present things to us. And those can be manipulated."

In order to accomplish the image of both twins conjoined onscreen in the film's finale (both played by Kidder), De Palma had Kidder photographed seated in two different positions, and then joined the images together via optical editing.

Musical score 
While editing the film in post-production, editor Paul Hirsch and De Palma listened to musical scores by Bernard Herrmann (particularly for Psycho, Marnie, and Vertigo) and played them along with the film's key scenes. This led to De Palma inquiring about Herrmann composing the film's musical score. At the time Herrmann was semi-retired, but admired the screenplay enough to agree to score the film.

Release 
Sisters had its world premiere at Filmex in Los Angeles, California on November 18, 1972. It was released theatrically in the United States by American International Pictures, opening in Los Angeles on April 18, 1973. It would later expand, opening in New York City on September 26, 1973, where it received "rave reviews," and continued to screen into November 9, 1973. It was also selected for the 1975 Venice Film Festival.

Critical response

Contemporaneous 
The film was met with critical praise; Roger Ebert noted that the film was "made more or less consciously as an homage to Alfred Hitchcock", but said it "has a life of its own" and praised the performances of both Kidder and Salt. Vincent Canby of The New York Times called it " a good, substantial horror film" and stated "De Palma reveals himself here to be a first-rate director of more or less conventional material", also noting the film's references to Repulsion (1965) and Psycho (1960). Meanwhile, Variety, while stating it was "a good psychological murder melo-drama", said that "Brian De Palma's direction emphasizes exploitation values which do not fully mask script weakness." The Los Angeles Timess Kevin Thomas praised it as a "witty homage to Hitchcock" and a "low budget but high style scare show," as well as praising the performances and musical score. George McKinnon of The Boston Globe was less laudatory, writing: "It is difficult to determine what De Palma had in mind in this morbid horror film. Did he intend it all as a parody or a straightforward Psycho-type movie? ...  If it is to be taken as a tongue-in-cheek romp, it doesn't work and if meant as a horror film it is run-of-the-mill."

The film received honors from the U.S. Film Festival in Dallas, Texas on April 13, 1973. Kidder also received an award for Best Actress at the Atlanta International Film Festival.

Retrospective 
Critical reassessment of the film in the 21st century has largely been favorable, with critic Robin Wood writing in 2003 that Sisters was "one of the great American films of '70s," while G. Allen Johnson of the San Francisco Chronicle considers it a key film in Kidder's career. Richard Brody wrote of the film in The New Yorker in 2016: 

In 2016, Justin Chang of the Los Angeles Times ranked the film as De Palma's most underrated of the 1970s, writing that "for all its low-budget creakiness, [it] feels fully formed—from its sly opening bit of misdirection to its adroit use of split-screen to its memorably churning Bernard Herrmann score. De Palma's choice of subject matter couldn't have been more appropriate: With this film he effectively conjoined himself to Hitchcock, announcing himself as a skillful mimic with a mischievous side all his own." Sisters currently has an 85% on the review aggregator Rotten Tomatoes from 47 reviews with the site's consensus reads, "Clever yet clearly indebted to the masters of the genre, Sisters offers an early glimpse of DePalma at his stylishly crafty peak".

Home media 
Sisters was released on VHS and Betamax videocassettes by Warner Home Video in the 1980s, and again in 2000 by Homevision. The film was released on DVD by The Criterion Collection on October 3, 2000 in a new widescreen digital transfer. On July 16, 2018, Criterion announced a Blu-ray release of the film featuring a new 4K transfer scheduled for October 23, 2018.

Remake 
The film was remade in 2006 under the same title, with Lou Doillon, Stephen Rea, and Chloë Sevigny in the leading roles.

See also 
 List of American films of 1973

References 
Notes

Bibliography

External links 
 
 
 
 
 
 Sisters – an essay by Bruce Kerwin at The Criterion Collection

1972 films
1972 horror films
1972 independent films
1970s English-language films
1970s exploitation films
1970s horror thriller films
1970s psychological horror films
1970s psychological thriller films
1970s slasher films
American exploitation films
American horror thriller films
American independent films
American International Pictures films
American neo-noir films
American psychological horror films
American psychological thriller films
American slasher films
Fictional conjoined twins
Films about dissociative identity disorder
Films about twin sisters
Films directed by Brian De Palma
Films scored by Bernard Herrmann
Films set in New York City
Films shot in New York City
1970s American films